Alfred John Momar N'Diaye (born 6 March 1990) is a professional footballer who plays as a defensive midfielder for Spanish club Málaga CF. Born in France, he represents the Senegal national team. He can also play as a centre back.

Club career

Early career
Born in Paris, France, N'Diaye began his career with US Vandœuvre in Vandœuvre-lès-Nancy. At the age of 14, he moved across the arrondissement to join the biggest club in the region, AS Nancy. Upon arrival, Alfred endured early struggles, but quickly gained noticed following his second season at the academy. In 2006, he signed his first professional contract.

Nancy
N'Diaye made his debut in the squad during the 2007–08 season in the Coupe de la Ligue, at the age of 17, coming on as a halftime substitute for Frédéric Biancalani in a 3–0 loss to Lens. That was his only appearance that season as he would be relegated back to the reserves helping a young Nancy reserve squad barely avoid relegation.

Following the season, N'Diaye earned promotion to the senior squad for the 2008–09 season. He was assigned the number 29 shirt and made his league debut in the opening match of the season against Lille appearing as a substitute in a 0–0 draw. Two months later, he earned his first league start in a 1–1 draw against Paris Saint-Germain. His positive play earned him regular starts in the squad, including playing the full 90 minutes in the club's 3–0 upset victory over Olympique de Marseille at the Stade Vélodrome and playing, on two occasions, 120 minutes of football in cup play against Grenoble in the Coupe de la Ligue and SO Romorantin in the Coupe de France. In total, he made 27 appearances and collected 7 yellow cards.

Bursaspor
On 1 July 2011, Nancy confirmed on its website that the club had reached an agreement with Turkish club Bursaspor for the transfer of N'Diaye. The deal was finalised on 3 July for a reported fee of €2 million.

Sunderland
On 9 January 2013, it was announced that Sunderland had completed the signing of N'Diaye for an undisclosed fee. He was given the number 4 shirt. On 12 January 2013, N'Diaye made his Sunderland debut at the Stadium of Light in a match which they won 3–0 against West Ham United. He came on as a substitute for Adam Johnson and almost scored with his first touch in English Football as his shot went just wide. His full debut for Sunderland came against Wigan away, in which he produced a "wonderful" assist for Steven Fletcher to score and put them in front.

Eskişehirspor (loan)
On 28 July 2013 it was announced N'Diaye would join Turkish club Eskişehirspor on a season-long loan. On 28 January 2014, Eskişehirspor announced that N'Diaye's loan had been terminated by the club.

Betis
On 30 January 2014, N'Diaye joined Spanish side Real Betis on loan for the remainder of the 2013–14 campaign. He appeared in 16 matches, as the Andalusians were relegated.

On 22 August 2014, free agent N'Diaye signed a five-year deal with the Béticos.

Villarreal
On 8 July 2016, N'Diaye signed a five-year contract with Villarreal CF also in the main category.

Hull City (loan)
On 31 January 2017, N'Diaye moved on loan to Hull City for the remainder of the 2016–17 Premier League season. N'Diaye made his debut and scored the first goal in a home 2–0 victory over Liverpool. Despite impressing during his 15 games at the club, N'Diaye was unable to keep Hull in the Premier League.

Wolverhampton Wanderers (loan)
On 31 August 2017, the transfer deadline day of the 2017/18 summer transfer window, N'Diaye completed a last-gasp loan deal (with the option of a permanent move) to English Championship club Wolverhampton Wanderers. He made his debut for the club on 9 September 2017, coming on as a substitute in a 1–0 win against Millwall. He scored his first goal for the club on 23 September 2017 in a 2–1 win against Barnsley after coming on as a substitute.

He played 36 games for Wolverhampton Wanderers in all competitions, as he helped the club win the EFL Championship title and gain promotion to the Premier League.

Málaga (loan)
On 10 August 2018, N'Diaye moved on loan to Málaga for the 2018–19 Segunda División season.

Al-Shabab
On 30 August 2019, N'Diaye moved to Saudi club Al-Shabab FC on a three-year contract.

On 24 August 2022, N'Diaye was released from his contract.

International career
Having played through the France national youth football teams, he decided to play for Senegal national team and played his first senior international match in 2013.

In May 2018 he was named in Senegal's 23-man squad for the 2018 FIFA World Cup in Russia. N'Diaye played for Senegal in two group stage matches during the tournament, against Poland and Japan respectively.

Career statistics

Club

International

Honours
Wolverhampton Wanderers
EFL Championship: 2017–18

References

External links

1990 births
Living people
Footballers from Paris
French sportspeople of Senegalese descent
French footballers
Senegalese footballers
Association football midfielders
AS Nancy Lorraine players
Bursaspor footballers
Sunderland A.F.C. players
Eskişehirspor footballers
Real Betis players
Villarreal CF players
Ligue 1 players
Süper Lig players
Premier League players
English Football League players
La Liga players
Saudi Professional League players
Hull City A.F.C. players
Wolverhampton Wanderers F.C. players
Málaga CF players
Al-Shabab FC (Riyadh) players
France under-21 international footballers
France youth international footballers
Senegal international footballers
Senegalese expatriate footballers
Expatriate footballers in Spain
Senegalese expatriate sportspeople in Spain
Expatriate footballers in Turkey
Senegalese expatriate sportspeople in Turkey
Expatriate footballers in England
Senegalese expatriate sportspeople in England
Expatriate footballers in Saudi Arabia
Senegalese expatriate sportspeople in Saudi Arabia
2015 Africa Cup of Nations players
2018 FIFA World Cup players
2019 Africa Cup of Nations players